McVey Memorial Forest is located near State Route 9999 in Randolph County, Indiana.  Located within the forest is Cherry Grove Cemetery which contains many historical grave sites from a local 19th century settlement known as Steubenville.  With the exception of posted signs and Cherry Grove Cemetery no other evidence of Stuebenville's existence is apparent, making it a "ghost town".  The site also contains a memorial for three fallen soldiers from the War of 1812.  Recently several strange happenings have occurred in this woods.  Hairy grass like men have been appearing and making strange noises.  These occurrences have prompted the Bigfoot Field Researchers Organization to investigate.  This mystery remains unsolved.

Recreational opportunities
Hiking
Nature center
Canoe run
Wildlife observation area

References

Forests of Indiana
Protected areas of Randolph County, Indiana